San Andrés is the capital city of the department of San Andrés, Providencia and Santa Catalina, in Colombia. As of 2005 its population was 55,426.

Overview
It is situated at the north end of San Andrés Island, on the Caribbean Sea. The population is considered to be about 20% Raizals and 80% mainland Colombians. The economy is mainly sustained by tourism and commercial fishing. Once a duty-free port, it still has a relatively vigorous shopping district selling various consumer goods at bargain prices, including Colombian gold and emerald jewellery, leather goods and other distinctively Colombian wares.

San Andrés has become such a byword for bargain shopping in Colombia that many towns and cities have a bargain shopping area known as a San Andresito ("little San Andres").

Twin towns
 San Clemente (California, USA)

References

External links
 
 

Port cities in the Caribbean
Populated places in the Archipelago of San Andrés, Providencia and Santa Catalina
Capitals of Colombian departments